Stefan Edberg was the defending champion, but lost in the semifinals this year.

Boris Becker won the tournament, beating John Fitzgerald in the final, 7–6(7–4), 6–4.

Seeds

  Stefan Edberg (semifinals)
  Boris Becker (champion)
  Andrés Gómez (quarterfinals)
  Darren Cahill (first round)
  Jay Berger (first round)
  John Fitzgerald (final)
  Slobodan Živojinović (second round)
  Dan Goldie (second round)

Draw

Finals

Top half

Bottom half

References

 Main Draw

1988 Grand Prix (tennis)
1988,Singles
1988 in Japan